Regina Theissl Pokorná (née Pokorná; born 18 January 1982) is a Slovak-Austrian chess player holding the title Woman Grandmaster (WGM).

Chess career 
Pokorná was trained by Grandmaster Ján Plachetka. Pokorná won the European girls under 10 championship in 1992 and the Slovak girls under 18 championship in 1996, 1997 and 1999. Also in 1999 she won the  European Junior Girls' Chess Championship in Patras, Greece. In 2000, she competed in the FIDE Women's Chess World Cup.

Pokorná represented Slovakia in eight Women's Chess Olympiads between 1998 and 2012. Her best result was in the 37th Chess Olympiad in Turin 2006, where she scored 7/10 and finished eighth among players playing board 3.

She represented Slovakia in three European Women's Team Chess Championships from 1997 to 2001, and won the team gold medal and individual bronze medal in Batumi 1999.

In 2009, Pokorná won the Slovak Women's Chess Championship. She has also won, or jointly won, a series of strong women's chess tournaments, including the Mediterranean Flowers tournaments in Rijeka in 2001, 2002, 2005, and 2009, the EWS Cup in Jakarta 2007, and the Mediterranean Golden Island tournament in Vrbnik 2008.

In 2015, she transferred federations to represent Austria.

In 2019 in Vienna she won Austrian Women's Chess Championship.

Personal life
Her sister Renata Pokorna is also a FIDE-rated chess player.

Her image was used in a sheet of four postage stamps, featuring leading female chess players, called "Chess Masters", issued in Chad in 2010.

Notable games 
 Regina Pokorna vs Nona Gaprindashvili, 4th European Championship (Women), (2003), Sicilian Defense: Classical Variation (B57), 1-0

References

External links 

Regina Theissl Pokorna chess games at 365Chess.com

1982 births
Living people
Chess woman grandmasters
Slovak female chess players
Austrian female chess players
Chess Olympiad competitors